Unigenes is a genus of plants in the Campanulaceae. It has only one known species, Unigenes humifusa , endemic to South Africa.

References

Lobelioideae
Monotypic Campanulaceae genera
Flora of South Africa